The papal conclave held from 5 to 7 May 1342 was convened after the death of Pope Benedict XII and elected Cardinal Pierre Roger to succeed as pope. The fourth pope of the period of the Avignon Papacy, he took the name Clement VI.

Cardinal electors

Pope Benedict XII died at Avignon on 25 April 1342. At the time of his death, there were nineteen cardinals in the Sacred College, of whom seventeen participated in the subsequent conclave:

Ten electors were creatures of John XXII, six of Benedict XII and one of Clement V. Thirteen of them were French, three Italian and one Spanish.

The post of the Camerlengo of the Holy Roman Church was occupied at that time by Gasbert de Valle, Archbishop of Narbonne (not a Cardinal) and nephew of Pope John XXII.

Absentee cardinals

Two French Cardinals, both elevated by John XXII, did not participate in this conclave:

The election of Pope Clement VI

The conclave started on May 5 and lasted only two days. On May 7 Cardinal Pierre Roger, former Chancellor of the Kingdom of France, was unanimously elected Pope, "by divine inspiration alone", as reported shortly thereafter Cardinals des Farges and Ceccano. Elect took the name of Clement VI. On May 19 new Pope was crowned in the church of the Dominicans in Avignon by Raymond Guillaume des Farges, protodeacon of S. Maria Nuova.

Shortly after the death of Benedict XII king Philip VI of France sent to Avignon his eldest son with the task to support the candidature of Cardinal Roger, but when he arrived, the election had been already accomplished with the result expected by the king.

Notes

Sources 
 
 G. Mollat "The Popes at Avignon 1305-1378", London 1963
 Wrigley, J.E. 1982. "The Conclave and the Electors of 1342". Archivum Historiae Pontificiae Roma, 20: 51-81.

Papal conclaves
14th-century elections
1342
Avignon Papacy
14th-century Catholicism
14th century in Europe